This article is about the particular significance of the year 1973 to Wales and its people.

Incumbents

Secretary of State for Wales – Peter Thomas
Archbishop of Wales – Gwilym Williams, Bishop of Bangor
Archdruid of the National Eisteddfod of Wales – Brinli

Events
10 February - A special conference of the Trades Union Congress is held at Llandrindod Wells as part of the campaign to establish a Wales TUC.
April - Elections take place to the new county councils of Wales
April - The first Welsh-language papur bro community newspaper, Y Dinesydd, is founded.
10 May - Elections take place to the new Wales district councils, with big gains for the Labour Party in South Wales.
May - Sony opens its factory in Bridgend, the first major Japanese investment in Wales.
15 May - The Llyn Brianne dam is officially opened by Princess Alexandra.
17 July - Sixteen-year-old Sandra Newton is found murdered at Tonmawr.
16 September - Sixteen-year-olds Geraldine Hughes and Pauline Floyd are found murdered at Llandarcy. Their murders, along with that of Sandra Newton in July, will remain unsolved for 29 years.
23 October - Professor Brian Josephson wins the Nobel Prize for Physics.
During the year, there are 424 road deaths in Wales - an all-time record.
Drilling for oil and gas begins off the coast of Wales. A fourth oil refinery opens at Milford Haven.

Arts and literature
The Welsh Philharmonia Orchestra is founded.
Theatr Ardudwy at Coleg Harlech, designed by Colwyn Foulkes & Partners, opens.
Sir Richard Armstrong becomes conductor of Welsh National Opera.
Joe Strummer begins his studies at Newport College of Art.
Welsh actress Angharad Rees marries Christopher Cazenove.

Awards

National Eisteddfod of Wales (held in Ruthin)
National Eisteddfod of Wales: Chair - Alan Llwyd
National Eisteddfod of Wales: Crown - Alan Llwyd
National Eisteddfod of Wales: Prose Medal - Emyr Roberts
National Eisteddfod of Wales: Drama Medal - Urien Wiliam

New books

English language
Leo Abse - Private Member
Gwynfor Evans - Wales Can Win
Richard Hughes - The Wooden Shepherdess
Emlyn Williams – Emlyn

Welsh language
Huw Lloyd Edwards - Y Llyffantod
Jane Edwards - Tyfu
W. J. Gruffydd (Elerydd) - Cerddi'r Llygad
Moses Glyn Jones - Y Ffynnon Fyw
T. Llew Jones - Barti Ddu
Judith Maro - Atgofion Haganah
Caradog Prichard - Afal Drwg Adda
Gomer M. Roberts - Cloc y Capel

New drama
Islwyn Ffowc Elis - Harris

Music
23 November - Max Boyce records his legendary Live at Treorchy show at Treorchy Rugby Club.
Karl Jenkins' first album with Soft Machine, Six, wins the Melody Maker British Jazz Album of the Year award.  Jenkins also wins the miscellaneous musical instrument award.
Grace Williams - Ave Maris Stella and Fairest of Stars

Visual arts
Ivor Roberts-Jones - Statue of Winston Churchill, Parliament Square, unveiled on 1 November by Lady Churchill.

Film

Welsh-language films
None

English-language films
Holiday on the Buses filmed on location at Pontins holiday camp, Prestatyn

Broadcasting
The Labour Party publishes a study arguing that independent television arrangements in the UK are causing non Welsh-speaking residents to lose their Welsh identity.

Welsh-language television
Youth music programme Disc a Dawn ends its six-year run, to be replaced the following year by Gwerin 74, a folk music show.

English-language television
Fish (with John Ogwen)
Hang out your Brightest Colours, controversial documentary by Kenneth Griffith
Philip Madoc makes a memorable appearance as a U-boat captain in Dad's Army.

Sport
Athletics – Cardiff Amateur Athletic Club wins the British Athletics League Championship for the second time.
Cycling – The Welsh Cycling Union is formed.
Horse racing – Geoff Lewis wins both the Epsom Oaks and the 1,000 Guineas on "Mysterious".
Rugby union – Japan plays its first rugby match in Europe at Penygraig in the Rhondda Valley.
Snooker – Ray Reardon wins his second World Championship title.
Berwyn Price wins BBC Wales Sports Personality of the Year.

Births
20 January - Stephen Crabb, politician (born in Scotland)
15 February - Adrian Lewis Morgan, actor
27 February - Mark Taylor, rugby player and manager
24 April - Gabby Logan, television presenter
3 May - Jamie Baulch, athlete (born in Nottingham)
10 May - Ryan Nicholls, footballer
29 May - Lee Jones, footballer
6 July - Bradley Dredge, golfer
6 August - Donna Lewis, singer
22 August - Lee Dainton, skateboarder
6 October - Ioan Gruffudd, actor
9 October - Sian Evans, singer
29 November - Ryan Giggs, footballer

Deaths
8 January - Sir David Hughes Parry, professor of law and university administrator, 80
11 January - Vernon Morris, cricketer
30 January - Trystan Edwards, architectural critic, town planner and amateur cartographer, 88
12 March - Willie Llewellyn, Wales international rugby player, 94
19 March - Sir Clement Price Thomas, surgeon, 79
23 May - Kenneth Allott, poet and critic
29 July - Guy Morgan, rugby player, 65
9 August - Donald Peers, singer, 66
11 August 
Johnnie Clay, Test cricketer, 75
Gil Morgan, rugby league player, 65
21 September - C. H. Dodd, theologian, 89
8 October - Evan Tom Davies, mathematician, 69
3 November - Melville Richards, academic, 63
4 November - Billy Williams, dual-code international rugby player, 67
16 November - Dai Hiddlestone, Wales international rugby player, 83
24 November - Brigadier Hugh Llewellyn Glyn Hughes, soldier and medical administrator, 81
date unknown
Anne Griffith-Jones, educationist, 83
Elena Puw Morgan, novelist
Wick Powell, rugby player

See also
1973 in Northern Ireland

References

 
Wales
 Wales